Garrett Lewis (April 2, 1935 – January 29, 2013) was an American actor, dancer, and set decorator. He was nominated for four Academy Awards in the category Best Art Direction.

Selected filmography
Lewis has been nominated for four Academy Awards for Best Art Direction:
 Beaches (1988)
 Glory (1989)
 Hook (1991)
 Bram Stoker's Dracula (1992)

Actor
Star! (1968) - Jack Buchanan
The Good Guys and the Bad Guys (1969) - Hawkins
Funny Lady (1975) - Production Singer
Oh! Heavenly Dog (1980) - Pamela Natwick Man No. 1

References

External links

1935 births
2013 deaths
American set decorators
Artists from St. Louis